Limonene-1,2-diol dehydrogenase (NAD+-dependent limonene-1,2-diol dehydrogenase) is an enzyme with systematic name menth-8-ene-1,2-diol:NAD+ oxidoreductase. This enzyme catalyses the following chemical reaction

 menth-8-ene-1,2-diol + NAD+  1-hydroxymenth-8-en-2-one + NADH + H+ (general reaction)
(1) (1S,2S,4R)-menth-8-ene-1,2-diol + NAD+  (1S,4R)-1-hydroxymenth-8-en-2-one + NADH + H+
(2) (1R,2R,4S)-menth-8-ene-1,2-diol + NAD+  (1R,4S)-1-hydroxymenth-8-en-2-one + NADH + H+

While the enzyme from the Gram-positive bacterium Rhodococcus erythropolis DCL14 can use both (1S,2S,4R)- and (1R,2R,4S)-menth-8-ene-1,2-diol as substrate, activity is higher with (1S,2S,4R)-menth-8-ene-1,2-diol as substrate.

References

External links 
 

EC 1.1.1